Thomas J. Jech (born January 29, 1944, in Prague) is a mathematician specializing in set theory who was at Penn State for more than 25 years.

Life
He was educated at Charles University (his advisor was Petr Vopěnka) and from 2000 is at the Institute of Mathematics of the Academy of Sciences of the Czech Republic.

Work
Jech's research also includes mathematical logic, algebra, analysis, topology, and measure theory.

Jech gave the first published proof of the consistency of the existence of a Suslin line.
With Karel Prikry, he introduced the notion of precipitous ideal. He gave several models where the axiom of choice failed, for example one with ω1 measurable. The concept of a Jech–Kunen tree is named after him and Kenneth Kunen.

Bibliography

 Lectures in set theory, with particular emphasis on the method of forcing, Springer-Verlag Lecture Notes in Mathematics 217 (1971) 
 The axiom of choice, North-Holland 1973 (Dover paperback edition )
 (with K. Hrbáček) Introduction to set theory, Marcel Dekker, 3rd edition 1999
 Multiple forcing, Cambridge University Press 1986
 Set Theory: The Third Millennium Edition, revised and expanded, 2006, Springer Science & Business Media, . 1st ed. 1978; 2nd (corrected) ed. 1997

References

External links

Home page, with a copy at Penn state.

1944 births
Living people
20th-century Czech mathematicians
21st-century Czech mathematicians
Set theorists
Czechoslovak mathematicians
Charles University alumni